Rucha Inamdar is an Indian film actress who has appeared in several Hindi films. Her film career began with the hindi feature films Children of War (2014) and Under the Same Sun (2015). In 2017, she made her commercial film debut in Ganesh Acharya's Marathi language film Bhikari, opposite Swwapnil Joshi, .
. Wedding cha shinema came next (2019). 
Rucha made her digital web series debut in Criminal Justice (Indian series) as Avni.Her performance was universally praised.Rucha can be seen in the Hotstar Specials web series "The Great Indian Murder" as Ritu Rai. Her upcoming Movies are Not Today (2021) and Mirage (2022)

Early life
Rucha had her upbringing in JJ Hospital campus, Mumbai and is a qualified dentist.

Career
Rucha has also performed in 70-75 television commercials with superstars including Amitabh Bachchan, Aamir Khan, Shah Rukh Khan, Anil Kapoor, John Abraham and has been directed by renowned directors including Anurag Kashyap, Shoojit Sircar, Pradeep Sarkar, Gauri Shinde, Vinil Mathew, Ram Madhvani, Prasoon Pandey, Abhishek Verman, Anupam Mishra, Prakash Varma and many more. Rucha has a theater background and is a trained Kathak and Latin ballroom dancer.

Filmography

References

External links 

Mumbai
Actresses in Hindi cinema
Indian film actresses
Indian actresses
Female models from Mumbai
21st-century Indian actresses
Actresses from Mumbai
Living people
People from Mumbai
1988 births